Jacques Perreten (25 February 1927 – 19 May 1995) was a Swiss ski jumper who competed in the 1950s. He finished 23rd in the individual large hill event at the 1952 Winter Olympics in Oslo.

References

External links
Olympic ski jumping results: 1948-60
  

Olympic ski jumpers of Switzerland
Ski jumpers at the 1952 Winter Olympics
Swiss male ski jumpers
1927 births
1995 deaths